Strome is a hamlet in east-central Alberta, Canada, within Flagstaff County. The hamlet was originally incorporated as a village on February 3, 1910. It dissolved to become a hamlet under the jurisdiction of Flagstaff County on January 1, 2016. Strome's name is believed to come from Stromeferry in Ross & Cromarty, Scotland.

History 
Strome began developing as a farming community in 1905. Max Knoll opened the first post office, under the name of Knollton, and set up the first general store. The name of the post office was changed to Strome on July 1, 1906. A hotel, a hardware store, and a church followed. Strome incorporated as a village on February 3, 1910.

Demographics 

As a designated place in the 2016 Census of Population conducted by Statistics Canada, Strome had a population of 260 living in 113 of its 123 total private dwellings, a  change from its 2011 population of 228.

See also 
List of communities in Alberta
List of former urban municipalities in Alberta
List of hamlets in Alberta

References

External links 

1910 establishments in Alberta
2016 disestablishments in Alberta
Designated places in Alberta
Flagstaff County
Former villages in Alberta
Hamlets in Alberta
Populated places disestablished in 2016